Lin Ho-ming (born 27 June 1928) is a Taiwanese former sports shooter. He competed at the 1964 Summer Olympics and the 1968 Summer Olympics.

References

External links
 

1928 births
Possibly living people
Taiwanese male sport shooters
Olympic shooters of Taiwan
Shooters at the 1964 Summer Olympics
Shooters at the 1968 Summer Olympics
People from Pingtung County
20th-century Taiwanese people